Junius Joseph "Jay" Hebert (February 14, 1923 – May 25, 1997) was an American professional golfer. He won seven times on the PGA Tour including the 1960 PGA Championship.  His younger brother, Lionel Hebert, also won the PGA Championship, in 1957, the last edition at match play. Jay played on the 1959 and 1961 Ryder Cup teams and was captain for the 1971 team.

Career
Hebert served in the Marines in World War II and rose to the rank of captain. He was wounded in the left thigh at the Battle of Iwo Jima and awarded a Purple Heart. Following the war, he played golf at LSU, where he and teammate Gardner Dickinson led the Tigers to the national championship in 1947.

Hebert worked as the playing pro at Mayfair Country Club in Sanford, Florida, in the 1950s. The club was home to a PGA Tour event, the Mayfair Inn Open, from 1955 to 1958.

Hebert was inducted into the Louisiana Sports Hall of Fame and the Texas Golf Hall of Fame in 1982.

Personal life
A Cajun by ethnicity, he was born in St. Martinville, Louisiana, and died in Houston, Texas.  His son, Jean-Paul Hebert, played golf at the University of Texas.

Professional wins (10)

PGA Tour wins (7)

PGA Tour playoff record (2–1)

Other wins (2)
1954 Long Island Open
1955 Long Island PGA Championship

Senior wins (1)
1994 Liberty Mutual Legends of Golf – Demaret Division (with Al Balding)

Major championships

Wins (1)

Results timeline

Note: Hebert never played in The Open Championship.

CUT = missed the half-way cut (3rd round cut in 1964 PGA Championship)
WD = withdrew
R64, R32, R16, QF, SF, F = Round in which player lost in PGA Championship match play
"T" = tied

Summary

Most consecutive cuts made – 17 (1953 U.S. Open – 1960 Masters)
Longest streak of top-10s – 6 (1957 Masters – 1959 Masters)

U.S. national team appearances
Professional
Ryder Cup: 1959 (winners), 1961 (winners), 1971 (non-playing captain, winners)

See also

List of men's major championships winning golfers

Video

References

External links
RaginPagin.com – Jay Hebert

American male golfers
LSU Tigers golfers
PGA Tour golfers
Winners of men's major golf championships
Ryder Cup competitors for the United States
Golfers from Louisiana
University of Louisiana at Lafayette alumni
Cajun people
United States Marine Corps officers
United States Marine Corps personnel of World War II
1923 births
1997 deaths